Spencer Heights is an unincorporated community in Pulaski County, Illinois, United States. It has a zip code of 62964 and a population of 1,386 (2015 data).

References

Unincorporated communities in Pulaski County, Illinois
Unincorporated communities in Illinois